Bongocheon is a river of North Korea. It is a river of the Han River system.

References

Rivers of North Korea